Nick Škorja (born 28 July 1998) is a Slovenian motorcycle speedway rider.

Career
Škorja appeared twice as a track reserve in the 2016 Speedway Grand Prix and once at the 2017 Speedway Grand Prix and 2018 Speedway Grand Prix. He has finished runner-up in the Slovenian Individual Speedway Championship in 2016, 2017, 2020 and 2022. He reached the finals of both the 2018 Speedway Under-21 World Championship and 2019 Speedway Under-21 World Championship.

In 2019 he was selected for the Slovenian team for the 2019 Speedway of Nations. He would have made his British league debut for Newcastle Diamonds in 2020 but the season was cancelled due to the COVID-19 pandemic. The following season he signed for Landshut Devils in the Polish league.

He has represented Slovenia in both the 2021 Speedway of Nations and 2022 Speedway of Nations.

Major results

World individual Championship
2016 Speedway Grand Prix - 26th (12 pts)
2017 Speedway Grand Prix - 37th (1 pt)
2018 Speedway Grand Prix - 36th (0 pt)

World team Championships
2018 Speedway of Nations - =7th
2019 Speedway of Nations - =8th
2021 Speedway of Nations - =11th
2022 Speedway of Nations - =9th

See also 
 Slovenia national speedway team

References 

1998 births
Living people
Slovenian speedway riders